Tatiana Calderón Noguera (born 10 March 1993) is a Colombian racing driver who currently drives the No. 11 Dallara-Chevrolet car part-time for A. J. Foyt Enterprises in the 2022 IndyCar Series. Calderón previously drove for the Drago Corse with ThreeBond squad in the Super Formula Championship and for Richard Mille Racing in the FIA World Endurance Championship.

Born into a family of car dealers, Calderón began racing go-karts at the age of nine, and was the first woman to win national karting championships in either Colombia or the United States. She progressed to car racing at the age of 17 in the Star Mazda Championship, taking two podiums in the 2011 season, a race victory in the 2014 Florida Winter Series, and was runner-up in the 2015–16 MRF Challenge Formula 2000 Championship. Calderón was the first woman to stand on the podium in the British Formula 3 International Series and the first to lead a lap in the FIA Formula 3 European Championship. From 2016 to 2018, she competed in the GP3 Series and later the 2019 FIA Formula 2 Championship. Calderón was employed by the Sauber Formula One team (later Alfa Romeo Racing) as a development and test driver from 2018 to 2021.

Early and personal life
Calderón was born in Colombia's capital of Bogotá on 10 March 1993 to Alberto Calderón Palau and María Clara Noguera Calderón. Alberto is the first cousin of Juan Manuel Santos, a former President of Colombia, and María is the daughter of Rodrigo Noguera Laborde, the co-founder of the Sergio Arboleda University. Her parents operate a Kia Motors dealership in Bogotá. Calderón has an older sister named Paula, who co-manages the career of her younger sibling with former driver Fernando Plata, and a younger brother, Felipe. She was educated at Colegio Helvetia in Bogotá from 1997 to 2011, learning English and German, along with her native Spanish, and accommodated her racing with her education, sometimes having to miss weeks of school. Calderón played football, tennis, field hockey, golf, and tried horse riding before settling on motor racing at the age of nine. Since 2012, she has lived in the Spanish capital of Madrid.

Karting (2002–2008)
Calderón was four years old when she had her first experience of driving in the streets of Bogotá sitting on her father's lap and holding the steering wheel of the family car. She was introduced to racing by her sister, and aged nine began driving go-karts visiting a rental race track north of Bogotá in the city's 170th street close to the family home with Paula and some of her friends. The two siblings went to the track every night after school and during the weekends. Around the age of ten Calderón began seriously considering a possible motor racing career. She persuaded her father greatly to purchase a green go-kart and a 50cc motorcycle for use on a personal basis on her family's farm and he educated her on racing's mechanical aspects. Calderón's mother tried to sway her away from racing because she believed it was too dangerous, though she later supported her daughter's career choice on the condition she maintained good grades in school. Calderón was inspired by Juan Pablo Montoya's achievements and Ayrton Senna, a three-time Formula One World Champion.

As she began winning races, Calderón was regularly rammed by her male rivals, forcing her to retaliate in response to demonstrate that she was undeterred by them. In the 2005 season, she won the EasyKart National Championship, making her the first woman to win a Colombian national karting title. The following year, she was runner-up in the EasyKart National Championship, took third in the Stars of Karting Este Division and was the Rotax Junior Division champion of the Colombian Kart Championship. Calderón drove her first racing car at age 14, sharing a Kia Picanto with her sister Paula. Around this time, the owners of her local go-kart track later allowed her to drive a professional four-stroke go-kart after she began winning races. In 2008, she became the first woman to win the Snap-On-Stars of Karting Divisional Championship-JICA Eastern Championship and the IAME International Challenge series. The former achievement made Calderón the first woman champion of a national American karting series.

Racing career

Junior open-wheel racing (2009–2014)
After winning the Snap-On-Stars of Karting Divisional Championship-JICA Eastern Championship, she told her parents of her decision to focus on racing and not enroll at university. Calderón had more success in 2009 when she made her sports car debut, coming second in the Radical European Master Series – SR5 with one victory and ten podium finishes, accruing 240 points for the PoleVision team. She finished second in that year's Colombian Rotax Senior Max Challenge. Aged 17, Calderón moved into open-wheel racing, driving in the Star Mazda Championship (part of the Road to Indy programme) in 2010 for Juncos Racing in its  25 car. She had five top-ten finishes, with a best of seventh in the first Autobahn Country Club race. In 13 races, Calderón finished with 320 points for a final championship position of 10th. She also won the Colombian Rotax Championship that year.

Calderón joined the Derek Daly Academy driver development programme in early 2011 after reading a book authored by Daly. While Daly advised Calderón and helped her to transition to driving more powerful cars, she stayed with Juncos Racing for the 2011 Star Mazda Championship and changed her car number to 10. Calderón took two third-place finishes at Barber Motorsports Park and Canadian Tire Motorsport Park. These results made her the first woman to mount the podium in Star Mazda Championship history. Her final championship position was sixth with 322 points scored. Calderón entered the final three rounds of the 2011 European F3 Open Championship for Team West-Tec in October, scoring three points by finishing eighth in the second Circuit de Catalunya race, placing 21st in the drivers' standings.

She entered into discussions to compete in Indy Lights for the 2012 season but she declined due to her and her father's dislike of oval tracks. Around this time, Calderón began working with racer Andy Soucek to better her driving ability. That year, she raced the entire 2012 European F3 Open Championship with EmiliodeVillota Motorsport with team owner Emilio de Villota as her race engineer. Calderón finished the season with eight top-ten finishes for ninth in the championship and 56 points scored. In October, she drove the final two weekends of the 2012 Formula Renault 2.0 Alps Series for AV Formula, scoring no points to place 33rd in the standings. Two months later, Calderón flew to Colombia to enter the 6 Hours of Bogotá in a No. 91 Radical car that she shared with Juan Camilo Acosta, Juan Esteban García and Luis Carlos Martínez, finishing third overall and second in class.

For the 2013 season, she joined Double R Racing for both the FIA Formula 3 European Championship and the British Formula 3 International Series. Before that, Calderón entered the five-round, fifteen-race New Zealand-based Toyota Racing Series with ETEC Motorsport as the series' sole woman driver. That year, she became the first woman to stand on the overall podium in British Formula 3 history with a third-place finish at the Nürburgring round. She scored no points in the European series, in part because of tyre issues, and Double R Racing's inexperience competing in the championship. In July, Calderón finished 20th in the Masters of Formula 3 at Circuit Zandvoort. In late October, she tested an Auto GP car in a two-day test session at the Circuito de Jerez. She made a guest appearance for EmiliodeVillota Motorsport in the season-ending European F3 Open Championship round at the Circuit de Catalunya but was ineligible to score points.

During the 2014 Florida Winter Series Calderón won her first open-wheel race at Sebring International Raceway. She finished fifth in the championship standings with two more top five finishes. Not long after, Calderón returned to Europe and entered the EuroFormula Open Winter series round at Circuit Paul Ricard, finishing fourth for EmiliodeVillota Motorsport. She had originally signed for Signature Team days before the 2014 FIA Formula 3 European Championship began; a lack of testing time and the misgivings of her being noncompetitive due to the car's under-powered engine led her to join Jo Zeller Racing. During the season, in which she was advised by Anthony Hamilton, the father of driver Lewis Hamilton, regular points-scoring finishes put her 15th in the drivers' standings. In November, Calderón became the first woman to contest the Macau Grand Prix since Cathy Muller in 1983, finishing 13th.

Further junior racing ventures and the GP3 Series (2015–2018) 

In late 2014, driver Susie Wolff began to mentor and advise Calderón. She moved to Carlin for the 2015 FIA Formula 3 European Championship after testing with the team in December 2014. Calderón briefly led the rain-affected third race at Spa-Francorchamps, becoming the first woman to lead a series race. She scored no points to go unranked in the 33-race season. During the 2015–2016 season, Calderón drove in the MRF Challenge Formula 2000 Championship for MRF Racing, where she developed a reputation for risky overtaking because the cars' low downforce allowed them to run close together. She consistently finished in the top five, winning at the Dubai Autodrome and was runner-up to Pietro Fittipaldi in the points standings.

Due to a regulation introduced by motorsport's governing body, the Fédération Internationale de l'Automobile, in late 2015 limiting drivers to three full seasons in European F3, Calderón was ineligible to enter the series for a fourth consecutive season. She instead contested the 2016 GP3 Series for Arden International and was the team's first woman driver in history. She had tested a World Series Formula V8 3.5 car with Pons Racing at Ciudad del Motor de Aragón in November 2015 before choosing GP3 two months later because it was faster. Calderón scored two points from tenth-place finishes at the Hockenheimring and the Autodromo Nazionale Monza for 21st in the drivers' championship. She was slow in qualifying, giving her an average starting position of 17th. Calderón was third at the Red Bull Ring and took 66 points for Teo Martín Motorsport and then RP Motorsport in six rounds of the Euroformula Open Championship. She was also a panellist on the Canal F1 Latin America show Directo Fórmula.

At the end of 2016, Calderón was introduced to the Sauber Formula One team principal Monisha Kaltenborn and began working for Sauber as a development driver. In addition to continuing her GP3 schedule, she conducted tests in Sauber's simulator and joined the team at race weekends. Calderón switched teams from Arden to DAMS for the 2017 season. She had a best result of seventh at the Monza feature race and was eighth at the Circuto de Jerez to finish 18th in the drivers' championship with seven points. Calderón drove in the series-ending round of the World Series Formula V8 3.5 at Bahrain International Circuit in place of Damiano Fioravanti at RP Motorsport. She finished third in the second race, taking the first podium finish for a woman in the series.

She moved to Jenzer Motorsport for the 2018 GP3 Series after DAMS left the championship. A month later, Sauber made Calderón its test driver, spending time in the team's simulator and engineers coached her at its headquarters and race circuits. In GP3, her performance improved from 2017, scoring 11 points over seven races for a championship placing of 16th. After Calderón expressed her hope of testing for Sauber before the year was over, she drove the team's C37 in a promotional day at the Autódromo Hermanos Rodríguez on 30 October, becoming the first Latin American woman to drive a Formula One car. Calderón drove a 2013 C32 car in a two-day test session at the Fiorano Circuit a month later. On 16 December, she tested the Techeetah DS E-TENSE FE19 electric car at the inaugural Formula E in-season test in Ad Diriyah, and drove it again in the series' rookie test at Marrakesh's Circuit International Automobile Moulay El Hassan on 13 January 2019.

FIA Formula 2 and progression into top-level racing (2019–present)

Calderón returned to Arden for the 2019 FIA Formula 2 Championship and became the first woman to drive in the series. The renamed Alfa Romeo Racing team retained her as its test driver for the year. She stated that her two Formula One test sessions assisted her acclimatisation to Formula 2. At the Baku feature race, Calderón became the first woman in history to lead a lap in Formula 2. Poor qualifying results from a lack of tyre preparation led her to employ different strategies to gain position in a feature race. She had two race engineers during the season. Calderón had a best finish of 11th at Circuit Paul Ricard and was 22nd in the drivers' standings with no points scored. Late in the year, she obtained sponsorship that allowed her to enter the season-ending Autódromo Hermanos Rodríguez double header round of the Porsche Supercup in Team Project 1's No. 24 911 GT3 Cup car, retiring from the first race and finishing 25th and last in the second.

Following the purchase of Arden's Formula 2 entry for the 2020 season by HWA Racelab and the signing of drivers Giuliano Alesi and Artem Markelov, Calderón left the team and sought a career in either American or endurance racing. As a result she left Formula 2 to join the Super Formula Championship with Drago Corse with ThreeBond for the 2020 season. Team owner Ryo Michigami negotiated with her late in December 2019 and concluded with an agreement not long after. Michigami selected Calderón over Nobuharu Matsushita for the seat and she spoke to him regularly about the SF19 car. In addition to her Super Formula seat she remained at Alfa Romeo's Formula One team as a test driver. Calderón worked with the reserve driver Robert Kubica to develop its C39 car, and was appointed an ambassador for the team. She also entered three rounds of the 2019–20 F3 Asian Championship with Seven GP, taking six top-ten finishes for 31 points and 13th in the drivers' standings.

She entered the 2020 24 Hours of Daytona (part of the IMSA SportsCar Championship) alongside Rahel Frey, Katherine Legge and Christina Nielsen in the No. 19 GEAR Racing Lamborghini Huracán GT3 Evo. Calderón prepared for the race by increasing her fitness regime and sleeping less in case she was told to drive early in the morning. Multiple car issues relegated the team to a 16th-place finish in class. She shared a Le Mans Prototype 2 (LMP2) Oreca 07-Gibson car in the European Le Mans Series with Sophia Flörsch on the all-female Signatech-run Richard Mille Racing team in 2020. Calderón finished the ELMS season with three top-tens for 11th in the Drivers' Championship with 19 points and was 23rd in the Super Formula Championship with zero points. In September, she made her 24 Hours of Le Mans debut alongside Flörsch and Beitske Visser, finishing ninth in LMP2 and 13th overall.

In 2021, Calderón raced in the FIA World Endurance Championship (WEC) in the No. 1 Richard Mille Racing-run Oreca 07-Gibson LMP2 car with Flörsch and Visser and continued to drive for the single car Drago Corse team in the Super Formula Championship. She was also retained as Alfa Romeo's test and development driver. Calderón's WEC season saw her finish 17th in the LMP2 Drivers' Championship with 23 points with four top-ten finishes in the five races that she entered. She concluded the Super Formula season without scoring any points in the four races she drove for 24th in the championship standings. Calderón tested Sébastien Bourdais' No. 14 A. J. Foyt Enterprises-prepared Dallara-Chevrolet car for 87 laps during a single day at Mid-Ohio Sports Car Course in July 2021 through a sponsorship agreement. She prepared for two weeks learning the circuit and the car and received coaching and mentoring. 

Calderón impressed A. J. Foyt Enterprises with her performance, and the team considered her a potential driver for the 2022 IndyCar Series. She left Alfa Romeo in 2021, and signed to drive the No. 11 A. J. Foyt Enterprises Dallara-Chevrolet vehicle, originally for each of the 12 street and road course rounds of the 2022 IndyCar Series; she was replaced by J. R. Hildebrand for the oval track races. Calderón struggled to acclimatise to the circuits she raced at owing to restrictions on testing that limited her to a single pre-season test session, her lack of IndyCar track knowledge as well as adapting to new tyres and a car requiring physical effort. After competing in seven races, she was sidelined due to repeated missed payments by her team's primary sponsor. She ended the season 29th in the drivers' standings with 58 points scored. In August, Calderón joined Charouz Racing System, replacing Cem Bölükbaşı for the concluding four rounds of the 2022 Formula 2 Championship with financing from pop singer Karol G. She injured her right hand in an accident with Olli Caldwell in the Monza sprint race and she spent the following two months recuperating with the help of therapy to regain her strength in her arm and injured hand. Calderón finished the year 28th in the Drivers' Championship and achieved no points-scoring finishes.

She left Charouz Racing System at the conclusion of the season due to her not having enough sponsorship funding in order for her to continue to race in Formula One's support categories or IndyCar.

Driving style 
Calderón describes herself as a smooth driver; she feels she reacts better to more powerful cars and in wet weather. Since women on average have less muscle mass than men, she trains intensely to be able to handle a high-performance racing vehicle, and she said that she increased the thickness of her neck by  while training to deal with the high amount of g-force that she feels in a Formula One car. Calderón's short stature of  means she finds it difficult to locate the correct angle and get the most power for her arms. She could not have a rest inserted at the back of her helmet due to restrictions in the GP3 Series regulations. Additionally, Calderón spent half of the 2016 season locating her preferred seating position, during which she made contact with her legs in the act of steering and decided to adjust the position of her car pedals to increase her comfort.

Racing record

Career summary

† As Calderón was a guest driver, she was ineligible for points. * Season still in progress.

American open–wheel racing results

Complete Star Mazda Championship results

IndyCar Series
(key) (Races in bold indicate pole position; races in italics indicate fastest lap)

Complete FIA Formula 3 European Championship results
(key)

Complete Macau Grand Prix results

Complete GP3 Series results
(key) (Races in bold indicate pole position) (Races in italics indicate fastest lap) (Small number denotes finishing position)

Complete FIA Formula 2 Championship results
(key) (Races in bold indicate pole position) (Races in italics indicate points for the fastest lap of top ten finishers) (Small number denotes finishing position)

† Driver did not finish the race, but was classified as she completed over 90% of the race distance.

Complete Porsche Supercup results
(key) (Races in bold indicate pole position) (Races in italics indicate fastest lap) (Small number denotes finishing position)

† As Calderón was a guest driver, she was ineligible for points.

Complete WeatherTech SportsCar Championship results
(key) (Races in bold indicate pole position; races in italics indicate fastest lap; small number denotes finishing position)

Complete European Le Mans Series results
(key) (Races in bold indicate pole position; results in italics indicate fastest lap)

Complete 24 Hours of Le Mans results

Complete Super Formula results
(key) (Races in bold indicate pole position) (Races in italics indicate fastest lap)

Complete FIA World Endurance Championship results
(key) (Races in bold indicate pole position) (Races in italics indicate fastest lap)

Notes and references

Notes

References

External links

 
 

1993 births
24 Hours of Le Mans drivers
A. J. Foyt Enterprises drivers
Arden International drivers
AV Formula drivers
British Formula Three Championship drivers
Carlin racing drivers
Charouz Racing System drivers
Colombian IndyCar Series drivers
Colombian racing drivers
DAMS drivers
De Villota Motorsport drivers
Double R Racing drivers
Euroformula Open Championship drivers
European Le Mans Series drivers
F3 Asian Championship drivers
Female IndyCar Series drivers
Female racing drivers
FIA Formula 2 Championship drivers
FIA Formula 3 European Championship drivers
FIA World Endurance Championship drivers
Formula Renault 2.0 Alps drivers
Colombian GP3 Series drivers
Indy Pro 2000 Championship drivers
IndyCar Series drivers
Jenzer Motorsport drivers
Jo Zeller Racing drivers
Juncos Hollinger Racing drivers
Living people
MRF Challenge Formula 2000 Championship drivers
Mücke Motorsport drivers
Porsche Supercup drivers
RP Motorsport drivers
Signature Team drivers
Sportspeople from Bogotá
Super Formula drivers
Team West-Tec drivers
Teo Martín Motorsport drivers
Toyota Racing Series drivers
WeatherTech SportsCar Championship drivers
World Series Formula V8 3.5 drivers
Colombian expatriate sportspeople in Spain